Arturo Tapia González (born January 25, 1991 in Toluca, Mexico) is a former Mexican professional footballer who last played for Cafetaleros de Chiapas.

References

1991 births
Living people
Mexican footballers
Atlético Mexiquense footballers
Deportivo Toluca F.C. players
Potros UAEM footballers
Ascenso MX players
Liga MX players
People from Toluca
Association football forwards